The Harold Herzlich Distinguished Technology Achievement Medal is an award conferred that recognizes "innovators, who through persistence and dedication, have advanced a paradigm shift in tire manufacturing, tire reliability or performance". It is awarded as a part of the biennial ITEC tire show. Prior to 2012, it had been known by the name ITEC Distinguished Technology Achievement Award.

Recipients 

2012 - Marion Pottinger
2014 - Bernhard Blümich
2016 - Andreas Limper
2018 - Steven M. Cron
2020 - Walter H. Waddell
2022 - William V. Mars

References 

Tire industry